Émile Joseph Molinié (1 June 1877, La Rochelle – circa 1964) was a 20th-century French architect.

The son of Henri Deglane, occasional collaborator of Charles Nicod, rather active in Cannes, he was made a Chevalier of the Légion d'honneur in 1926.

Creations 
 1913: ateliers for artists, 7 rue Lebouis, 14th arrondissement of Paris, nowadays headquarters of the Fondation Cartier pour l'Art Contemporain. In 1913, the façade was awarded at the concours de façades de la ville de Paris.
 1914: building at 43 rue Émile-Ménier, 16th, this building was the subject of a publication: Monographies de Bâtiments Modernes. Maison rue Émile Menier N° 43 à Paris, Mr. E. Molinié, Architecte, Paris, Ducher Fils, 1914.
 1923–1925, lotissement concerté de l'Avenue-du-Parc-Saint-James, avenue du Parc-Saint-James and rue du Bois-de-Boulogne in Neuilly-sur-Seine in collaboration with Charles Nicod and Albert Pouthier
 1929: Villa Domergue, Cannes, with Charles Nicod.
 1935: former Picard printing, 10 rue Falguière, 14th, with Charles Nicod.
 1954: building at 9-13 avenue Myron-Herrick, 18th.
 1954: building at 1-3 rue du Colonel-Driant; 29 rue Jean-Jacques Rousseau, 1st.

External links 
 Notice on Achiwebture
 List of war memorials by Molinier on Monuments aux morts
 Emile Molinié, Charles Nicod et Georges de Montaut
 Some of his creations with links to each of them 

20th-century French architects
Chevaliers of the Légion d'honneur
People from La Rochelle
1877 births
1960s deaths